Suwon Hyundai Engineering & Construction Hillstate is a South Korean professional volleyball team. The team was founded in 1977 and became fully professional in 2005. They are based in Suwon and are members of the Korea Volleyball Federation (KOVO). Their home arena is Suwon Gymnasium in Suwon.

History 
The team won its first championship title in the 2010–11 season. In March 2016, Hyundai Hillstate won the club's second championship title by defeating the 2015–16 regular season winners Hwaseong IBK Altos 3–0 in the finals. The championship MVP was awarded to the team's captain Yang Hyo-jin.

Honours 
 Korea Volleyball Super League
 Champions (10): 1985, 1986, 1987, 1988, 1990, 2000, 2001, 2002, 2003, 2004
Runners-up (4): 1984, 1991, 1993, 1999

 V-League
Champions (2): 2010−11, 2015–16
Runners-up (3): 2006−07, 2009−10, 2011−12

KOVO Cup
Winners (4): 2006, 2014, 2019, 2021
Runners-up (3): 2009, 2013, 2015

Season-by-season records

Players

2021−22 team

See also 
Hyundai Engineering & Construction

References

External links 
 Official website 

Volleyball clubs established in 1977
Sport in Suwon
Women's volleyball teams in South Korea
1977 establishments in South Korea
Hyundai Motor Group